Nicolás Bonanno (born 18 November 1991) is an Argentine handball player for BM Huesca and the Argentine national team.

He represented Argentina at the 2019 World Men's Handball Championship.

References

1991 births
Living people
Argentine male handball players
Expatriate handball players
Argentine expatriate sportspeople in Spain
Liga ASOBAL players
Handball players at the 2019 Pan American Games
Pan American Games medalists in handball
Pan American Games gold medalists for Argentina
Medalists at the 2019 Pan American Games
Handball players at the 2020 Summer Olympics
21st-century Argentine people
South American Games gold medalists for Argentina
South American Games silver medalists for Argentina
South American Games medalists in handball
Competitors at the 2018 South American Games
Competitors at the 2022 South American Games